Aaqtanit is a  local authority/village in the Sidon District in Lebanon. It is located  53 km southeast of Beirut.

History
In 1875 Victor Guérin noted on his travels in the region: "I stop for a few moments at A'ktenit. This village has a population of 400 Maronites. The church, dedicated to St. George, is of recent date. Near there, I notice the ruins of a small fort, of which there is still a section of wall, 26 steps long and built with huge blocks, some completely flattened, the others raised with bossing. At the bottom we can see the remains of an ancient reservoir, now filled, next to a spring called A'ïn A'ktenit."

References

Bibliography

External links
Aaqtanit, Localiban

Populated places in Sidon District
Maronite Christian communities in Lebanon